The Lepanto class was a class of five destroyers of the Spanish Navy, which originated from the US Navy s. They entered service in 1957, with the last one being decommissioned in 1988.

History 
These are ships used by the United States Navy during World War II and slightly modernized in electronics and weaponry at the beginning of the 1950s. They were once magnificent ships, which throughout the 1960s constituted the backbone of the Spanish Navy. Eventually, they were replaced in escort duties by the s in the early 1980s. However, they remained in service until well into the 1980s, when they were downright obsolete.

They were all put out of service between 1985 till 1988.

Characteristics 

Before the takeover, the ships were modernized to a considerable extent. All but three 20 mm Oerlikon cannons were removed and the three 40 mm Bofors guns remained. The electronics were modernized and the mast was replaced by a tripod mast.

All five ships were retrofitted with two triple Mark 44 torpedo tubes on each side of the ship.

Ships in the class

See also 
 Churruca-class destroyer (1972) (Gearing-class destroyer): another destroyers transferred from US Navy to Armada Española

Citations 

Destroyer classes
 
Destroyers of the Spanish Navy
Ships transferred from the United States Navy to the Spanish Navy